In arithmetic geometry, the Mordell–Weil group is an abelian group associated to any abelian variety  defined over a number field , it is an arithmetic invariant of the Abelian variety. The main structure theorem about this group is the Mordell–Weil theorem which shows this group is in fact a finitely-generated abelian group.

Examples 
Constructing explicit examples of the Mordell–Weil group of an abelian variety is a non-trivial process which is not always guaranteed to be successful, so we instead specialize to the case of a specific elliptic curve . Let  be defined by the Weierstrass equationover the rational numbers. It has discriminant  (and this polynomial can be used to define a global model ). It can be foundthrough the following procedure. First, we find some obvious torsion points by plugging in some numbers, which areIn addition, after trying some smaller pairs of integers, we find  is a point which is not obviously torsion. In addition, we know the point  has infinite order because otherwise there would be a prime factor shared by both cardinalities, so the rank is at least . Now, computing the rank is a more arduous process consisting of calculating the group  where  using some long exact sequences from homological algebra and the Kummer map.

Theorems concerning special cases 
There are many theorems in the literature about the structure of the Mordell–Weil groups of abelian varieties of specific dimension, over specific fields, or having some other special property.

Abelian varieties over the rational function field k(t) 
Note  which follows from the map being hyperelliptic. This can be used to define the twisted abelian variety  defined over  using general theory of algebraic geometrypg 5.

Theorem 

See also 

 Mordell–Weil theorem

References

Further examples and cases 

 The Mordell–Weil Group of Curves of Genus 2
 Determining the Mordell–Weil group of a universal elliptic curve
 Galois descent and twists of an abelian variety
 On Mordell–Weil groups of Jacobians over function fields

Diophantine geometry
Elliptic curves
Abelian varieties